In the 1891 Iowa State Senate elections Iowa voters elected state senators to serve in the twenty-fourth Iowa General Assembly. Elections were held in 32 of the state senate's 50 districts. State senators serve four-year terms in the Iowa State Senate.

A statewide map of the 50 state Senate districts in the 1891 elections is provided by the Iowa General Assembly here.

The general election took place on November 3, 1891.

Following the previous election, Republicans had control of the Iowa Senate with 28 seats to Democrats' 20 seats, one seat for the Union Labor Party and one Independent.

To claim control of the chamber from Republicans, the Democrats needed to net 5 Senate seats.

Democrats claimed control of the Iowa State Senate following the 1891 general election with the balance of power shifting to Democrats holding 25 seats, Republicans having 24 seats, and a lone seat for the People's Party (a net gain of 5 seats for Democrats and 1 seat for the People's Party).

Summary of Results
Note: The holdover Senators not up for re-election are not listed on this table.

Source:

Detailed Results
NOTE: The Iowa Official Register does not contain detailed vote totals for state senate elections in 1891.

See also
 Elections in Iowa

References

Iowa Senate
Iowa
Iowa Senate elections